In Greek mythology, Ceyx (/ˈsiːɪks/; Ancient Greek: Κήϋξ, translit. Kēüx) was a king of Trachis in Thessaly. He received Heracles, and Heracles's sons later fled to him.  Some accounts make him Amphitryon's nephew, with Heracles building Trachis for him. Muller supposes that the marriage of Ceyx and his connection with Heracles were the subjects of ancient poems.

Ceyx befriended Heracles and offered him protection against King Eurystheus. Ceyx's son Hippasus accompanied Heracles on his campaign against King Eurytus of Oechalia, during which Hippasus was slain in battle. Ceyx was also called the father of Hylas and Themistonoe, who married King Cycnus

Notes

References 

 Antoninus Liberalis, The Metamorphoses of Antoninus Liberalis translated by Francis Celoria (Routledge 1992). Online version at the Topos Text Project.
 Apollodorus, The Library with an English Translation by Sir James George Frazer, F.B.A., F.R.S. in 2 Volumes, Cambridge, MA, Harvard University Press; London, William Heinemann Ltd. 1921. ISBN 0-674-99135-4. Online version at the Perseus Digital Library. Greek text available from the same website.
 Hesiod, Shield of Heracles from The Homeric Hymns and Homerica with an English Translation by Hugh G. Evelyn-White, Cambridge, MA.,Harvard University Press; London, William Heinemann Ltd. 1914. Online version at the Perseus Digital Library. Greek text available from the same website.
 Pausanias, Description of Greece with an English Translation by W.H.S. Jones, Litt.D., and H.A. Ormerod, M.A., in 4 Volumes. Cambridge, MA, Harvard University Press; London, William Heinemann Ltd. 1918. . Online version at the Perseus Digital Library
 Pausanias, Graeciae Descriptio. 3 vols. Leipzig, Teubner. 1903.  Greek text available at the Perseus Digital Library.

External links
Perseus Encyclopaedia

Kings in Greek mythology
Mythology of Heracles